Acoustic Classics II is the seventeenth solo studio album by British singer/songwriter Richard Thompson. It was released by Beeswing Records on 10 August 2017.

Background

Acoustic Classics II is the second acoustic compilation album by Richard Thompson. The songs range from his time in Fairport Convention, as half of a duo with Linda Thompson and as a solo artist.

The album was released on Vinyl, CD and digital download.

Critical reception

On the Metacritic website, which aggregates reviews from critics and assigns a normalised rating out of 100, Acoustic Classics II received a score of 78, based on 1 mixed and 4 positive reviews.

Among the critics that gave the album positive reviews, Uncut called the album "an unalloyed treat" adding that "there's something fundamentally satisfying about Thompson unplugged". Andy Gill writing in The Independent states that "there’s no dip in quality here as Richard Thompson revisits material" and Folk Radio UK call the album "one to treasure". David Honigman of The Financial Times writes that "this second volume Richard Thompson has recorded of acoustic cover versions of his own songs works better than the first" and Jude Rogers in The Guardian praises Thompson's "authoritative, confident voice" and "pearl-bright guitar-playing".

Track listing
All tracks written by Richard Thompson except “Crazy Man Michael” by Thompson and Dave Swarbrick

Personnel
Richard Thompson - guitars and vocals

Chart performance

References

Richard Thompson (musician) albums
2017 albums